In aviation, a water landing is, in the broadest sense, an aircraft landing  on a body of water. Seaplanes, such as floatplanes and flying boats, land on water as a normal operation. Ditching is a controlled emergency landing on the water surface in an aircraft not designed for the purpose, a very rare occurrence. Controlled flight into the surface and uncontrolled flight ending in a body of water (including a runway excursion into water) are generally not considered water landings or ditching.

Aircraft water landings

By design

Seaplanes, flying boats, and amphibious aircraft are designed to take off and alight on water. Alighting can be supported by a hull-shaped fuselage and/or pontoons. The availability of a long effective runway was historically important on lifting size restrictions on aircraft, and their freedom from constructed strips remains useful for transportation to lakes and other remote areas. The ability to loiter on water is also important for marine rescue operations and fire fighting. One disadvantage of water alighting is that it is dangerous in the presence of waves. Furthermore, the necessary equipment compromises the craft's aerodynamic efficiency and speed.

Early crewed spacecraft launched by the United States were designed to alight on water by the splashdown method. The craft would parachute into the water, which acted as a cushion to bring the craft to a stop; the impacts were violent but survivable. Alighting over water rather than land made braking rockets unnecessary, but its disadvantages included difficult retrieval and the danger of drowning. The NASA Space Shuttle design was intended to land on a runway instead. Since 2020 the SpaceX Dragon has used water landings. The Boeing CST-100 is designed to do likewise.

In distress
While ditching is extremely uncommon in commercial passenger travel, small aircraft tend to ditch slightly more often because they usually have only one engine and their systems have fewer redundancies. According to the National Transportation Safety Board, there are about a dozen ditchings per year.

General aviation
General aviation includes all fields of aviation outside of military or scheduled (commercial) flights. This classification includes small aircraft, e.g., training aircraft, airships, gliders, helicopters, and corporate aircraft, including business jets and other for-hire operations. General aviation has the highest accident and incident rate in aviation, with 16 deaths per million flight hours, compared to 0.74 deaths per million flight hours for commercial flights (North America and Europe).

Commercial aircraft

The FAA does not require commercial pilots to train to ditch but airline cabin personnel must train on the evacuation process. In addition, the FAA implemented rules under which circumstances (kind of operator, number of passengers, weight, route) an aircraft has to carry emergency equipment including floating devices such as life jackets and life rafts.

Some aircraft are designed with the possibility of a water landing in mind. Airbus aircraft, for example, feature a "ditching button" which, if pressed, closes valves and openings underneath the aircraft, including the outflow valve, the air inlet for the emergency RAT, the avionics inlet, the extract valve, and the flow control valve. It is meant to slow flooding in a water landing.

Airplane water ditchings

Aircraft landing on water for other reasons

Aircraft also sometimes end up in water by running off the ends of runways, landing in water short of the end of a runway, or even being forcibly flown into the water during suicidal/homicidal events. Twice at LaGuardia Airport, an aircraft have rolled into the East River (USAir Flight 5050 and USAir Flight 405).

 5 September 1954: KLM Flight 633, a Lockheed L-1049C-55-81 Super Constellation, suffered a re-extension of the landing gear shortly after taking off from Shannon Airport, which the flight crew was not aware. This caused the plane to descend and ditch into the River Shannon. 28 of the 56 people on board survived.
 
 13 January 1969: Scandinavian Airlines System Flight 933, a McDonnell Douglas DC-8-62, ditched in Santa Monica Bay while on approach to runway 07R of Los Angeles International Airport, California. Out of the 45 people on board the plane, 4 drowned, 11 are missing and presumed dead, 17 were injured, and 13 sustained no injuries.
 
 
 
 
 
 28 February 1984: Scandinavian Airlines System Flight 901, a McDonnell Douglas DC-10-30, overran the runway shortly after landing at John F. Kennedy International Airport and ended up with its nose in shallow water. All 177 occupants on board survived with 12 of them sustaining injuries.
 
 31 August 1988: CAAC Flight 301, a Hawker Siddeley Trident, overran the runway at Kai Tak international Airport and ended up in Kowloon Bay, breaking into two pieces. 7 of the 89 occupants on board perished and 15 others sustained injuries.
 26 September 1988: Aerolineas Argentinas Flight 648, a Boeing 737, landed hard and overran the runway at Ushuaia Airport and ended up in shallow water. All 62 people aboard survived.
 
 
 
 
 
 
 
 3 May 2019: Miami Air International Flight 293, a Boeing 737-800, hydroplaned and experienced a runway excursion upon landing at Naval Air Station Jacksonville. The airplane came to rest in the shallow waters of St. Johns River, sustaining substantial damage. All 143 passengers and crew on board the plane survived, although twenty-one people on board suffered minor injuries.

Military aircraft
A limited number of pre-World War II military aircraft, such as the Grumman F4F Wildcat and Douglas TBD Devastator, were equipped with flotation bags that kept them on the surface in the event of a ditching.

The "water bird" emergency landing is a technique developed by the Canadian Forces to safely land the Sikorsky CH-124 Sea King helicopter if one engine fails while flying over water. The emergency landing technique allows the boat-hull equipped aircraft to land on the water in a controlled fashion.

Launch vehicle water landings
Beginning in 2013 and continuing into 2014 and 2015, a series of ocean water landing tests were undertaken by SpaceX as a prelude to bringing booster rockets back to the launch pad in an effort to reuse launch vehicle booster stages. Seven test flights with controlled-descents have been conducted by April 2015.

Prior to 2013, successful water landings of launch vehicles were not attempted, while periodic water landings of space capsules have been accomplished since 1961. The vast majority of space launch vehicles take off vertically and are destroyed on falling back to earth. Exceptions include suborbital vertical-landing vehicles (e.g., Masten Xoie or the Armadillo Aerospace' Lunar Lander Challenge vehicle), and the spaceplanes that use the vertical takeoff, horizontal landing (VTHL) approach (e.g., the Space Shuttle, or the USAF X-37) which have landing gear to enable runway landings. Each vertical-takeoff spaceflight system to date has relied on expendable boosters to begin each ascent to orbital velocity. This is beginning to change.

Recent advances in private space transport, where new competition to governmental space initiatives has emerged, have included the explicit design of recoverable rocket technologies into orbital booster rockets. SpaceX has initiated and funded a multimillion-dollar program to pursue this objective, known as the reusable launch system development program.

The orbital-flight version of the SpaceX design was first successful at accomplishing a water landing (zero velocity and zero altitude) in April 2014 on a Falcon 9 rocket and was the first successful controlled ocean soft touchdown of a liquid-rocket-engine orbital booster.
Seven test flights with controlled-descent test over-water landings, including two with failed attempts to land on a floating landing platform, have been conducted by April 2015.

References

Further reading

 Aviation incidents by result from the Aviation Safety Network; see Off runway in water, CFIT into water, and Ditching.
 , cites data that show an 88% survival rate for general aviation water ditchings.
  (Corrected version of September; see here for some complaints.)
 
 
  Reproduced on Equipped To Survive.
 

Emergency aircraft operations
Types of landing
Water